Gajendra Singh Rajukhedi (born 11 December 1964 in Village Rajukhedi, Dhar district) is an Indian politician, belonging to Indian National Congress. In the 2009 election he was elected to the 15th Lok Sabha from the Dhar Lok Sabha constituency of Madhya Pradesh.

He was also member of 12th and 13th Lok Sabha from Dhar.

He is an Advocate and resides at Dhar. He is married to Mrs Gayatri Singh and has two daughters and two sons. His youngest son is Revti Raman Rajukhedi. He is a law student.

References

External links

India MPs 2009–2014
1964 births
Living people
People from Madhya Pradesh
People from Dhar district
India MPs 1998–1999
India MPs 1999–2004
Indian National Congress politicians
Indian National Congress politicians from Madhya Pradesh
Lok Sabha members from Madhya Pradesh